Carex alata, commonly called broad-winged sedge, is a species of flowering plant in the sedge family. It is native to eastern North America, in Canada and the United States. It grows in wet, marshy areas. The species name  is Latin for "winged", in reference to its winged perigynia.

Description
Carex alata is a perennial that flowers in spring, fruiting in late spring and summer. It may go dormant in hot summer weather if soils are not kept consistently moist.

References

alata
Taxa named by John Torrey
Flora of North America